The Family Conspiracy (1962) is a novel for children by Australian author Joan Phipson; it was illustrated by Margaret Horder.  It won the Children's Book of the Year Award: Older Readers in 1963.

Story outline
The Barker family run a sheep farm in the Central West of New South Wales. When Mrs Barker is diagnosed with a medical condition that requires hospitalisation the family children create a "conspiracy" to raise the money required for her treatment.

Critical reception
Writing in The Canberra Times a reviewer was impressed by the characterisation of the children: "These are no juvenile prodigies, outsmarting adults at every turn; they are very real people, combining childish strength and faults, and their actions are entirely credible. There is a great deal more that could be said in praise of this book; of its unassuming but faithful picture of the Australian country, and of the people who help give it character; of its patches of breathless adventure; and of the competent way in which characters and plot are welded together."

Awards
 1963 - winner Children's Book of the Year Award: Older Readers

See also
 1962 in Australian literature

References

Australian children's books
1962 Australian novels
Novels set in New South Wales
CBCA Children's Book of the Year Award-winning works
1962 children's books
Angus & Robertson books